Jon-Ross Charles Campbell (born 9 July 1990) is a West Indian first-class and T20 cricketer.

Domestic career
He made his debut for Jamaica in February 2010 in West Indies' Regional Four Day Competition. He has played seven first class matches till date, and he played his FC match in March 2015. In April 2010, he made his T20 debut and has played two T20 matches till date. 
In June 2021, he was selected to take part in the Minor League Cricket tournament in the United States following the players' draft.

References

External links
 

1990 births
Living people
Jamaica cricketers